Roderick Gielisse (born 4 February 1990) is a Dutch footballer who plays as a right back for Rijnsburgse Boys in the Tweede Divisie. He formerly played for ADO Den Haag, FC Dordrecht and Sparta Rotterdam.

References

1990 births
Living people
Dutch footballers
ADO Den Haag players
FC Dordrecht players
Sparta Rotterdam players
Rijnsburgse Boys players
Eredivisie players
Eerste Divisie players
Tweede Divisie players
Derde Divisie players
Sportspeople from Voorburg

Association football midfielders
Footballers from South Holland